Seville is the capital and largest city of the Spanish autonomous community of Andalusia and the province of Seville. It is situated on the lower reaches of the River Guadalquivir, in the southwest of the Iberian Peninsula.

Seville has a municipal population of about 685,000 , and a metropolitan population of about 1.5 million, making it the largest city in Andalusia, the fourth-largest city in Spain and the 26th most populous municipality in the European Union. The capital of Andalusia features hot temperatures in the summer, with daily maximums routinely above  in July and August.

Known as Ishbiliyah after the Islamic conquest in 711, Seville became the centre of the independent Taifa of Seville following the collapse of the Caliphate of Córdoba in the early 11th century; later it was ruled by Almoravids and Almohads until being incorporated to the Crown of Castile in 1248. Owing to its role as gateway of the Spanish Empire's trans-atlantic trade, managed from the Casa de Contratación, Seville became one of the largest cities in Western Europe in the 16th century. Coinciding with the Baroque period, the 17th century in Seville represented the most brilliant flowering of the city's culture; then began a gradual economic and demographic decline as silting in the Guadalquivir forced the trade monopoly to relocate to the nearby port of Cádiz.

The 20th century in Seville saw the tribulations of the Spanish Civil War, decisive cultural milestones such as the Ibero-American Exposition of 1929 and Expo '92, and the city's election as the capital of the Autonomous Community of Andalusia.

Name

Other names
Hisbaal is the oldest name for Seville. It appears to have originated during the Phoenician colonisation of the Tartessian culture in south-western Iberia and it refers to the god Baal. According to Manuel Pellicer Catalán, the ancient name was Spal, and it meant "lowland" in the Phoenician language (cognate to the Hebrew Shfela and the Arabic Asfal ). After the Umayyad invasion, this name remained in use among the Mozarabs, being adapted into Arabic as Išbīliya: since the /p/ phoneme does not exist in Arabic, it was replaced by /b/; the Latin place-name suffix -is was Arabized as -iya, and a  turned into ī  due to the phonetic phenomenon called imāla.

In the meantime, the city's official name had been changed to Ḥimṣ al-Andalus, in reference to the city of Homs in modern Syria, the jund of which Seville had been assigned to upon the Umayyad conquest; "Ḥimṣ al-Andalus" remained a customary and affectionate name for the city during the whole period throughout the Muslim Arab world, being referred to for example in the encyclopedia of Yaqut al-Hamawi or in Abu al-Baqa ar-Rundi's Ritha' al-Andalus.

The city is sometimes referred to as the "Pearl of Andalusia".

Motto
NO8DO is the official motto of Seville, popularly believed to be a rebus signifying the Spanish , meaning "She [Seville] has not abandoned me". The phrase, pronounced with synalepha as  no-madeja-do, is written with an eight in the middle representing the word   "skein [of wool]". Legend states that the title was given by King Alfonso X, who was resident in the city's Alcázar and supported by the citizens when his son, later Sancho IV of Castile, tried to usurp the throne from him.

The emblem is present on Seville's municipal flag, and features on city property such as manhole covers, and Christopher Columbus's tomb in the cathedral.

History

Seville is approximately 2,200 years old. The passage of the various civilizations instrumental in its growth has left the city with a distinct personality, and a large and well-preserved historical centre.

Early periods

The mythological founder of the city is Hercules (Heracles), commonly identified with the Phoenician god Melqart, who the myth says sailed through the Strait of Gibraltar to the Atlantic, and founded trading posts at the current sites of Cádiz and of Seville. The original core of the city, in the neighbourhood of the present-day street, Cuesta del Rosario, dates to the 8th century BC, when Seville was on an island in the Guadalquivir. Archaeological excavations in 1999 found anthropic remains under the north wall of the Real Alcázar dating to the 8th–7th century BC. The town was called Hisbaal by the Phoenicians and by the Tartessians, the indigenous pre-Roman Iberian people of Tartessos, who controlled the Guadalquivir Valley at the time.

The city was known from Roman times as Hispal and later as Hispalis. Hispalis developed into one of the great market and industrial centres of Hispania, while the nearby Roman city of Italica (present-day Santiponce, birthplace of the Roman emperors Trajan and Hadrian) remained a typically Roman residential city. Large-scale Roman archaeological remains can be seen there and at the nearby town of Carmona as well.

Existing Roman features in Seville itself include the remains exposed in situ in the underground Antiquarium of the Metropol Parasol building, the remnants of an aqueduct, three pillars of a temple in Mármoles Street, the columns of La Alameda de Hércules and the remains in the Patio de Banderas square near the Seville Cathedral. The walls surrounding the city were originally built during the rule of Julius Caesar, but their current course and design were the result of Moorish reconstructions.

Following Roman rule, there were successive conquests of the Roman province of Hispania Baetica by the Germanic Vandals, Suebi and Visigoths during the 5th and 6th centuries.

Middle Ages
In the wake of the Islamic conquest of the Iberian Peninsula, Seville (Spalis) was seemingly taken by Musa ibn Nusayr in the late summer of 712, while he was on his way to Mérida. Yet it had to be retaken in July 713 by troops led by his son Abd al-Aziz ibn Musa, as the Visigothic population who had fled to Beja had returned to Seville once Musa left for Mérida. The seat of the Wali of Al-Andalus (administrative division of the Umayyad Caliphate) was thus established in the city until 716, when the capital of Al-Andalus was relocated to Córdoba.

Seville (Ishbīliya) was sacked by Vikings in the mid-9th century. After Vikings arrived by 25 September 844, Seville fell to invaders on 1 October, and they stood for 40 days before they fled from the city. During Umayyad rule, under an Andalusi-Arab framework, the bulk of the population were Muladi converts, to which Christian and Jewish minorities added up. Up until the arrival of the Almohads in the 12th century, the city remained as the see of a Metropolitan Archbishop, the leading Christian religious figure in al-Andalus. However, the transfer of the relics of Saint Isidore to León circa 1063, in the taifa period, already hinted at a possible worsening of the situation of the local Christian minority.

A powerful taifa kingdom with capital in Seville emerged after 1023, in the wake of the fitna of al-Andalus. Ruled by the Abbadid dynasty, the taifa grew by aggregation of smaller neighbouring taifas. During the taifa period, Seville became an important scholarly and literary centre. After several months of siege, Seville was conquered by the Almoravids in 1091.

The city fell to the Almohads on 17 January 1147 (12 Shaʽban 541). After an informal Almohad settlement in Seville during the early stages of the Almohad presence in the Iberian Peninsula and then a brief relocation of the capital of al-Andalus to Córdoba in 1162 (which had dire consequences for Seville, reportedly depopulated and under starvation), Seville became the definitive seat of the Andalusi part of the Almohad Empire in 1163, a twin capital alongside Marrakech. Almohads carried out a large urban renewal. By the end of the 12th century, the walled enclosure perhaps contained 80,000 inhabitants.

In the wider context of the Castilian–Leonese conquest of the Guadalquivir Valley that ensued in the 13th century, Ferdinand III laid siege on Seville in 1247. A naval blockade came to prevent relief of the city. The city surrendered on 23 November 1248, after fifteen months of siege. The conditions of capitulation contemplated the eviction of the population, with contemporary sources seemingly confirming that a mass movement of people out of Seville indeed took place.

The city's development continued after the Castilian conquest in 1248. Public buildings were constructed including churches—many of which were built in the Mudéjar and Gothic styles—such as the Seville Cathedral, built during the 15th century with Gothic architecture. Other Moorish buildings were converted into Catholic edifices, as was customary of the Catholic Church during the Reconquista. The Moors' Palace became the Castilian royal residence, and during Pedro I's rule it was replaced by the Alcázar (the upper levels are still used by the Spanish royal family as the official Seville residence).

After the 1391 pogrom, believed to having been instigated by the Archdeacon Ferrant Martínez, all the synagogues in Seville were converted to churches (renamed Santa María la Blanca, San Bartolomé, Santa Cruz, and Convento Madre de Dios). The Jewish quarter's land and shops (which were located in modern-day Barrio Santa Cruz) were appropriated by the church. Many Jews were killed during the pogrom, although most were forced to convert.

The first tribunal of the Spanish Inquisition was instituted in Seville in 1478. Its primary charge was to ensure that all nominal Christians were really behaving like Christians, and not practicing what Judaism they could in secret. At first, the activity of the Inquisition was limited to the dioceses of Seville and Córdoba, where the Dominican friar, Alonso de Ojeda, had detected converso activity. The first Auto de Fé took place in Seville on 6 February 1481, when six people were burned alive. Alonso de Ojeda himself gave the sermon. The Inquisition then grew rapidly. The Plaza de San Francisco was the site of the 'autos de fé'. By 1492, tribunals existed in eight Castilian cities: Ávila, Córdoba, Jaén, Medina del Campo, Segovia, Sigüenza, Toledo, and Valladolid; and by the Alhambra Decree all Jews were forced to convert to Catholicism or be exiled (expelled) from Spain.

Early modern period
Following the Columbian exploration of the New World, Seville was chosen as headquarters of the Casa de Contratación in 1503, which was the decisive development for Seville becoming the port and gateway to the Indies. Unlike other harbours, reaching the port of Seville required sailing about  up the River Guadalquivir. The choice of Seville was made in spite of the difficulties for navigation in the Guadalquivir stemming from the increasing tonnage of ships as a result of the relentless drive to make maritime transport cheaper during the late Middle Ages. Nevertheless, technical suitability issues notwithstanding, the choice was still reasonable in the sense that Seville had become the largest demographic, economic and financial centre of Christian Andalusia in the late Middle Ages.

A 'golden age of development' commenced in Seville, due to its being the only port awarded the royal monopoly for trade with the growing Spanish colonies in the Americas and the influx of riches from them.

Since only sailing ships leaving from and returning to the inland port of Seville could engage in trade with the Spanish Americas, merchants from Europe and other trade centres needed to go to Seville to acquire New World trade goods. The city's population grew to more than a hundred thousand people.

In the late 16th century the monopoly was broken, with the port of Cádiz also authorised as a port of trade. Throughout the 17th century, colonial trade declined. Spain's American Colonies improved their production of basic goods, reducing their need to import. Compounded with these tribulations was the silting of the Guadalquivir river in the 1620s, which made Seville's harbors harder to use, and ceased upriver shipping. The Great Plague of Seville in 1649, exacerbated by excessive flooding of the Guadalquivir, reduced the population by almost half, and it would not recover until the early 19th century. By the 18th century, Seville's international importance was in decline. After the silting up of the harbour by the River Guadalquivir, upriver shipping ceased and the city went into relative economic decline.

The writer Miguel de Cervantes lived primarily in Seville between 1596 and 1600. Because of financial problems, Cervantes worked as a purveyor for the Spanish Armada, and later as a tax collector. In 1597, discrepancies in his accounts of the three years previous landed him in the Royal Prison of Seville for a short time. His short story Rinconete y Cortadillo, since the 19th century one of his most-read pieces, includes much description of Sevillian society; it features two young vagabonds who come to Seville, attracted by the riches and disorder that the 16th-century commerce with the Americas had brought to the city.

During the 18th century Charles III of Spain promoted Seville's industries. Construction of the Real Fábrica de Tabacos (Royal Tobacco Factory) began in 1728. It was the second-largest building in Spain, after the royal residence El Escorial. Since the 1950s it has been the seat of the rectorate (administration) of the University of Seville, as well as its Schools of Law, Philology (language/letters), Geography, and History.

More operas have been set in Seville than in any other city of Europe. In 2012, a study of experts concluded the total number of operas set in Seville is 153. Among the composers who fell in love with the city are Beethoven (Fidelio), Mozart (The Marriage of Figaro and Don Giovanni), Rossini (The Barber of Seville), Donizetti (La favorite), and Bizet (Carmen).

The first newspaper in Spain outside of Madrid was Seville's Hebdomario útil de Seville, which began publication in 1758.

Late modern history

Between 1825 and 1833, Melchor Cano acted as chief architect in Seville; most of the urban planning policy and architectural modifications of the city were made by him and his collaborator Jose Manuel Arjona y Cuba.

Industrial architecture surviving today from the first half of the 19th century includes the ceramics factory installed in the Carthusian monastery at La Cartuja in 1841 by the Pickman family, and now home to the El Centro Andaluz de Arte Contemporáneo (CAAC), which manages the collections of the Museo de Arte Contemporáneo de Sevilla. It also houses the rectory of the UNIA.

In the years that Queen Isabel II ruled directly, about 1843–1868, the Sevillian bourgeoisie invested in a construction boom unmatched in the city's history. The Isabel II bridge, better known as the Triana bridge, dates from this period; street lighting was expanded in the municipality and most of the streets were paved during this time as well.

By the second half of the 19th century, Seville had begun an expansion supported by railway construction and the demolition of part of its ancient walls, allowing the urban space of the city to grow eastward and southward. The Sevillana de Electricidad Company was created in 1894 to provide electric power throughout the municipality, and in 1901 the Plaza de Armas railway station was inaugurated.

The Museum of Fine Arts (Museo de Bellas Artes de Sevilla) opened in 1904.

In 1929 the city hosted the Ibero-American Exposition, which accelerated the southern expansion of the city and created new public spaces such as the Plaza de España and the Maria Luisa Park. Not long before the opening, the Spanish government began a modernisation of the city in order to prepare for the expected crowds by erecting new hotels and widening the mediaeval streets to allow for the movement of automobiles.

Seville fell very quickly at the beginning of the Spanish Civil War in 1936. General Queipo de Llano carried out a coup within the city, quickly capturing the city centre. Radio Seville opposed the uprising and called for the peasants to come to the city for arms, while workers' groups established barricades. Queipo then moved to capture Radio Seville, which he used to broadcast propaganda on behalf of the Francoist forces. After the initial takeover of the city, resistance continued among residents of the working-class neighbourhoods for some time, until a series of fierce reprisals took place.

Under Francisco Franco's rule Spain was officially neutral in World War II (although it did collaborate with the Axis powers), and like the rest of the country, Seville remained largely economically and culturally isolated from the outside world. In 1953 the shipyard of Seville was opened, eventually employing more than 2,000 workers in the 1970s. Before the existence of wetlands regulation in the Guadalquivir basin, Seville suffered regular heavy flooding; perhaps worst of all were the floods that occurred in November 1961 when the River Tamarguillo, a tributary of the Guadalquivir, overflowed as a result of a prodigious downpour of rain, and Seville was consequently declared a disaster zone.

Trade unionism in Seville began during the 1960s with the underground organisational activities of the Workers' Commissions or Comisiones Obreras (CCOO), in factories such as Hytasa, the Astilleros shipyards, Hispano Aviación, etc. Several of the movement's leaders were imprisoned in November 1973.

Recent developments 
On 3 April 1979 Spain held its first democratic municipal elections after the end of Franco's dictatorship; councillors representing four different political parties were elected in Seville. On 5 November 1982, Pope John Paul II arrived in Seville to officiate at a Mass before more than half a million people at the fairgrounds. He visited the city again on 13 June 1993, for the International Eucharistic Congress.

In 1992, coinciding with the fifth centenary of the Discovery of the Americas, the Universal Exposition was held for six months in Seville, on the occasion of which the local communications network and urban infrastructure was greatly improved under a 1987 PGOU plan launched by Mayor Manuel del Valle: the SE-30 ring road around the city was completed and new highways were constructed; the new Seville-Santa Justa railway station had opened in 1991, while the Spanish High-Speed Rail system, the Alta Velocidad Española (AVE), began to operate between Madrid-Seville. The Seville Airport was expanded with a new terminal building designed by the architect Rafael Moneo, and various other improvements were made. The Alamillo Bridge and the Centenario Bridge, both crossing over the Guadalquivir, also were built for the occasion. Some of the installations remaining at the site after the exposition were converted into the Scientific and Technological Park Cartuja 93.

In 2004 the Metropol Parasol project, commonly known as Las Setas (The Mushrooms), due to the appearance of the structure, was launched to revitalise the Plaza de la Encarnación, for years used as a car park and seen as a dead spot between more popular tourist destinations in the city. The Metropol Parasol was completed in March 2011, costing just over €102 million in total, more than twice as much as originally planned. Constructed from crossed wooden beams, Las Setas is said to be the largest timber-framed structure in the world.

Geography and climate

Location

The city is situated in the fertile valley of the River Guadalquivir. Most of the city is on the east side of the river, while Triana, La Cartuja and Los Remedios are on the west side. The Aljarafe region lies further west, and is considered part of the metropolitan area. The city has boundaries on the north with La Rinconada, La Algaba and Santiponce; on the east with Alcalá de Guadaira; on the south with Dos Hermanas and Gelves and on the west with San Juan de Aznalfarache, Tomares and Camas.

Seville is on the same parallel as United States west coast city San Jose in central California. São Miguel, the main island of the Azores archipelago, lies on the same latitude. Further east from Seville in the Mediterranean Basin, it is on the same latitude as Catania in Sicily, Italy and just south of Athens, the capital of Greece. Beyond that, it is located on the same parallel as South Korean capital, Seoul. Seville is located inland, not very far from the Andalusian coast, but still sees a much more continental climate than the nearest port cities, Cádiz and Huelva. Its distance from the sea makes summers in Sevilla much hotter than along the coastline.

Climate

Seville has a Mediterranean climate (Köppen climate classification Csa), featuring very hot, dry summers and mild winters with moderate rainfall. Seville is located in the lower part of the Guadalquivir Valley, which is often referred to as "the frying pan of Spain", as it features the hottest cities in the country.

Seville is the warmest city in Continental Europe. It is also the hottest major metropolitan area in Europe, with summer average high temperatures of above  and also the hottest in Spain.

Temperatures above  are not uncommon in summer. This temperature would be one of the highest ever recorded in Spain, yet it hasn't been officially confirmed.

The average sunshine hours in Seville are approximately 3000 per year. Snowfall is virtually unknown, and the last important snowfall occurred in 1954. Since the year 1500, only 10 snowfalls have been recorded/reported in Seville. During the 20th century, Seville registered just 2 snowfalls, the last one on 2 February 1954.

Government

Municipal government and administration

Seville is a municipality, the basic level of local government in Spain. The Ayuntamiento is the body charged with the municipal government and administration. The Plenary of the ayuntamiento is formed by 31 elected municipal councillors, who in turn invest the mayor. The last municipal election took place on 26 May 2019. The current mayor is Antonio Muñoz (Spanish Socialist Workers' Party), who has held the post since the reign of the previous mayor, Juan Espadas in early 2022.

Regional and provincial capital
Seville is the capital of the autonomous community of Andalusia, according to Article 4 of the Statute of Autonomy of Andalusia of 2007, and is the capital of the Province of Seville as well. The historical building of the Palace of San Telmo is now the seat of the presidency of the Andalusian Autonomous Government. The administrative headquarters are in Torre Triana, in La Cartuja. The Hospital de las Cinco Llagas (literally, "Hospital of the Five Holy Wounds") is the current seat of the Parliament of Andalusia.

Districts and neighbourhoods

The municipal administration is decentralized into 11 districts, further divided into 108 neighbourhoods.

 Casco Antiguo
 Distrito Sur
 Triana
 Macarena
 Nervión
 Los Remedios
 Este-Alcosa-Torreblanca
 Cerro-Amate
 Bellavista-La Palmera
 San Pablo-Santa Justa

Main sights

Seville is a big tourist centre in Spain. In 2018, there were over 2.5 million travellers and tourists who stayed at a tourist accommodation, placing it third in Spain after Madrid and Barcelona. The city has an overall low level of seasonality, so there are tourists year-round. There are many landmarks, museums, parks, gardens and other kinds of tourist spots around the city so there is something for everyone.

The Alcázar, the Cathedral, and the Archivo General de Indias (General Archive of the Indies) are UNESCO World Heritage Sites.

Landmarks

The St. Mary of the See Cathedral was built from 1401 to 1519 after the Reconquista on the former site of the city's mosque. It is among the largest of all medieval and Gothic cathedrals, in terms of both area and volume. The interior is the longest nave in Spain and is lavishly decorated, with a large quantity of gold evident. La Giralda is a tower attached to the Cathedral that dates back to the twelfth century. It was originally built as part of a mosque when the Moors ruled in Spain and was later added onto by the Christians. Tourists today can climb the tower by walking up a series of ramps that were previously used by officials who rode their horses to the top of the tower. The overall tower construction is consistent with Roman lighthouse construction methods such as with the
Tower of Hercules (circa 2nd century CE) built on the northwest coast of Spain. La Giralda gets its name from the weathervane attached to the very top of it, as "gira" means "turning one" in the Spanish language.

The Alcázar facing the cathedral was developed from a previous Moorish Palace which was developed from a Visigoth establishment which was itself developed from an existing Roman construction. The redevelopment was started in 1181 and continued for over 500 years, mainly in the Mudéjar style, but also in the Renaissance style. The TV show Game of Thrones has shot many scenes at this location.

The Church of Saint Louis of France, located in the historic district of Seville represents an example of Baroque architecture in the 18th century.

The Torre del Oro was built as a watchtower and defensive barrier on the river. The river was used as a mode of defense. A chain was strung through the water from the base of the tower to prevent boats from traveling into the river port.

The City Hall was built in the 16th century in high Plateresque style by master architect Diego de Riaño. The façade to Plaza Nueva was built in the 19th century in Neoclassical style.

The Palacio de San Telmo, formerly the University of Sailors, and later the Seminary, is now the seat for the Andalusian Autonomous Government. It is one of the most emblematic buildings of baroque architecture, mainly to its world-renowned churrigueresque principal façade and the impressive chapel.

The Royal Tobacco Factory is housed on the original site of the first tobacco factory in Europe, a vast 18th-century building in Baroque style and the purported inspiration for the opera Carmen.

The Metropol Parasol, in La Encarnación square, is the world's largest wooden structure. A monumental umbrella-like building designed by the German architect Jürgen Mayer, finished in 2011. This modern architecture structure houses the central market and an underground archaeological complex. The terrace roof is a city viewpoint.

The General Archive of the Indies, is the repository of extremely valuable archival documents illustrating the history of the Spanish Empire in the Americas and the Philippines. The building itself, an unusually serene and Italianate example of Spanish Renaissance architecture, was designed by Juan de Herrera.

The Plaza de España in the Parque de María Luisa (María Luisa Park) was built by the architect Aníbal González for the 1929 Exposición Ibero-Americana. It is an outstanding example of Regionalist Revival Architecture, a bizarre and loftily conceived mixture of diverse historic styles, such as Art Deco and lavishly ornamented with typical glazed tiles.

The Moorish urban influences continued and are present in contemporary Seville, for instance in the custom of decorating with plants and small fountains in the courtyards of the houses. However, most buildings of the Moorish aesthetic actually belong to the Mudéjar style of Islamic art, developed under Christian rule and inspired by the Arabic style. Original Moorish buildings are the Patio del Yeso in the Alcázar, the city walls, and the main section of the Giralda, the bell tower of the Seville Cathedral.

The neighbourhood of Triana, situated on the west bank of the River Guadalquivir, had an important role in the history of the city and constitutes by itself a folk, monumental and cultural centre.

On the other hand, La Macarena neighbourhood is located on the northern side of the city centre. It contains some important monuments and religious buildings, such as the Museum and Catholic Church of La Macarena or the Hospital de las Cinco Llagas.

Museums

The most important art collection of Seville is the Museum of Fine Arts of Seville. It was established in 1835 in the former Convent of La Merced. It holds many masterworks by Murillo, Pacheco, Zurbarán, Valdés Leal, and others masters of the Baroque Sevillian School, containing also Flemish paintings of the 15th and 16th centuries.

Other museums in Seville are:
 The Archaeological Museum, which contains collections from the Tartessian, Roman and some of Almohad and Christian periods, located in América square at the Parque de María Luisa (María Luisa Park).
 The Museum of Arts and Traditions, also in América Square, in front of the Archaeological Museum.
 The Andalusian Contemporary Art Centre, situated in the neighbourhood of La Cartuja.
 The Naval Museum, housed in the golden Torre del Oro, next to the River Guadalquivir.
 The Carriages Museum, in the Los Remedios neighbourhood.
 The Flamenco Art Museum
 The Bullfighting Museum, in the La Maestranza bullring
 The Palace of the Countess of Lebrija, a private collection that contains many of the mosaic floors discovered in the nearby Roman town of Italica.
 The Centro Velázquez (Velázquez Centre) located at the Old Priests Hospital in the touristic Santa Cruz neighbourhood.
 The Antiquarium in Metropol Parasol, an underground museum which is composed of the most important archaeological site of the ancient Roman stage of Seville and remains preserved.
 The Castillo de San Jorge (Castle of St. George) is situated near the Triana market, next to the Isabel II bridge. It was the last seat for the Spanish Inquisition.
 The Museum and Treasure of La Macarena, where the collection of the Macarena brotherhood is exhibited. This exhibition gives visitors an accurate impression of Seville's Holy Week.
 La Casa de la Ciencia (The House of Science), a science centre and museum opposite the María Luisa Park.
 Museum of Pottery in Triana.
 Pabellon de la Navegación (Pavilion of Navigation).

Parks and gardens

 The Parque de María Luisa (María Luisa Park), is a monumental park built for the 1929 World's Fair held in Seville, the Exposición Ibero-Americana. The so-called Jardines de las Delicias (literally, Delighting Gardens), closer to the river, are part of the Parque de María Luisa.
 The Alcázar Gardens, within the grounds of the Alcázar palace, consist of several sectors developed in different historical styles.
 The Gardens of Murillo and the Gardens of Catalina de Ribera, both along and outside the South wall of the Alcázar, lie next to the Santa Cruz quarter.
 The Parque del Alamillo y San Jerónimo, the largest park in Andalusia, was originally built for Seville Expo '92 to reproduce the Andalusian native flora. It lines both Guadalquivir shores around the San Jerónimo meander. The 32-metres-high bronze sculpture, The Birth of a New Man (popularly known as Columbus's Egg, el Huevo de Colón), by the Georgian sculptor Zurab Tsereteli, is located in its northwestern sector.
 The American Garden, also completed for Expo '92, is in La Cartuja. It is a public botanical garden, with a representative collection of American plants donated by different countries on the occasion of the world exposition. Despite its extraordinary botanical value, it remains a mostly abandoned place.
 The Buhaira Gardens, also historically known as the Huerta del Rey, are a public park and historic site, originally created as a garden estate during the Almohad period (12th century).

Culture

Theaters

The Teatro Lope de Vega is located on Avenida de María Luisa avenue (next to Parque de María Luisa). It was built in 1929, being its architect Vicente Traver y Tomás. It was the auditorium of the pavilion of the city in the Ibero-American Exhibition. This pavilion had a large room that became the Casino of the Exhibition. The theater occupied an area of 4600 m2 and could accommodate 1100 viewers. Its architecture is Spanish Baroque Revival, being the building faithful to this style both in the set and in its ornamentation.

It has hosted varied performances, including theater, dance, opera, jazz, and flamenco and nowadays the most outstanding of the panorama is its programming national and international, becoming one of the most important theaters in Spain.

Others important theatres are Teatro de la Maestranza, Auditorio Rocío Jurado and Teatro Central.

Seville also has a corral de comedias theatre, which is the Corral del Coliseo, now used as a residential building.

Festivals 
There are many entertainment options around the city of Seville and one of its biggest attractions is the numerous festivals that happen around the year. Some of the festivals concentrate on religion and culture, others focus on the folklore of the area, traditions, and entertainment.

Holy Week in Seville 

Semana Santa is celebrated all over Spain and Latin America, but the celebration in Seville is large and well known as a Fiesta of International Tourist Interest. 54 local brotherhoods, or "cofradías", organize floats and processions throughout the week, reenacting the story of the Passion of Christ. There is traditional music and art incorporated into the processions, making Semana Santa an important source of both material and immaterial Sevillian cultural identity.

Bienal de Flamenco 
Seville is home to the bi-annual flamenco festival La Bienal, which claims to be "the biggest flamenco event worldwide" and lasts for nearly a month.

Velá de Santiago y Santa Ana 
In the district of Triana, the Velá de Santiago y Santa Ana is held every July and includes sporting events, performances, and cultural activities as the city honors St. James and St. Ana.

Feria de Abril 

The April Fair (Feria de Abril) is a huge celebration that takes place in Seville about two weeks after the Holy Week. It was previously associated with celebrating livestock; however, nowadays its purpose is to create a fun cheerful environment tied to the appreciation of the Spanish folklore.

During the Feria, families, businesses, and organisations set up casetas (marquees) in which they spend the week dancing, drinking, and socialising. Traditionally, women wear elaborate flamenco dresses and men dress in their best suits. The marquees are set up on a permanent fairground in the district of Los Remedios, in which each street is named after a famous bullfighter.

Salón Náutico Internacional de Sevilla 
The International Boat Show of Seville is an annual event that takes place in the only indoor maritime port of the country, which is one of the most important in Europe.

Music

Seville had a vibrant rock music scene in the 1970s and 1980s with bands like Triana, Alameda and Smash, who fused Andalusia's traditional flamenco music with British-style progressive rock. The punk rock group Reincidentes and indie band Sr Chinarro, as well as singer Kiko Veneno, rose to prominence in the early 1990s. The city's music scene now features rap acts such as SFDK, Mala Rodríguez, Dareysteel, Tote King, Dogma Crew, Bisley DeMarra, Haze and Jesuly. Seville's diverse music scene is reflected in the variety of its club-centred nightlife.

The city is also home to many theatres and performance spaces where classical music is performed, including Teatro Lope de Vega, Teatro La Maestranza, Teatro Central, the Real Alcazar Gardens and the Sala Joaquín Turina.

Despite its name, the sevillana dance, commonly presented as flamenco, is not thought to be of Sevillan origin. However, the folksongs called sevillanas are authentically Sevillan, as is the four-part dance performed with them.

In 2023, Seville will host the 24th Annual Latin Grammy Awards, making Seville the first city outside of the United States to host the Latin Grammy Awards.

Flamenco

The Triana district in Seville is considered a birthplace of flamenco, where it found its beginning as an expression of the poor and marginalized. Seville's Gypsy population, known as Flamencos, were instrumental in the development of the art form. While it began as and remains a representation of Andalusian culture, it has also become a national heritage symbol of Spain.

There are more flamenco artists in Seville than anywhere else in the country, supporting an entire industry surrounding it and drawing in a significant amount of tourism for the city.

Gastronomy

The tapas scene is one of the main cultural attractions of the city: people go from one bar to another, enjoying small dishes called tapas (literally "lids" or "covers" in Spanish, referring to their probable origin as snacks served on small plates used to cover drinks). Local specialities include fried and grilled seafood (including squid, choco (cuttlefish), swordfish, marinated dogfish, and ortiguillas), grilled and stewed meat, spinach with chickpeas, Jamón ibérico, lamb kidneys in sherry sauce, snails, caldo de puchero, and gazpacho. A sandwich known as a serranito is the typical and popular version of fast food.

Typical desserts from Seville include pestiños, a honey-coated sweet fritter; torrijas, fried slices of bread with honey; roscos fritos, deep-fried sugar-coated ring doughnuts; magdalenas or fairy cakes; yemas de San Leandro,  which provide the city's convents with a source of revenue; and tortas de aceite, a thin sugar-coated cake made with olive oil. Polvorones and mantecados are traditional Christmas products, whereas pestiños and torrijas are typically consumed during the Holy Week.

Bitter Seville oranges grow on trees lining the city streets. Large quantities are collected and exported to Britain to be used in marmalade. Locally, the fruit is used predominantly in aromatherapy, herbal medicine, and dietary diet products, rather than as a foodstuff. According to legend, the Arabs brought the bitter orange to Seville from East Asia via Iraq around the 10th century to beautify and perfume their patios and gardens, as well as to provide shade. The flowers of the tree are a source of neroli oil, commonly used in perfumery and in skin lotions for massage.

In 2021, the municipal water company, Emasesa, began a pilot scheme to use the methane produced as the fruit ferments to generate clean electricity. The company plans to use 35 tonnes of fruit to generate clean energy to power one of the city's water purification plants.

Economy

Seville is the most populated city in southern Spain, and has the largest GDP (gross domestic product) of any in Andalusia, accounting for one-quarter of its total GDP. All municipalities in the metropolitan area depend directly or indirectly on Seville's economy, while agriculture dominates the economy of the smaller villages, with some industrial activity localised in industrial parks. The Diputación de Sevilla (Deputation of Seville), with provincial headquarters in the Antiguo Cuartel de Caballería (Old Cavalry Barracks) on Avenida Menendez Pelayo, provides public services to distant villages that they can not provide themselves.

The economic activity of Seville cannot be detached from the geographical and urban context of the city; the capital of Andalusia is the centre of a growing metropolitan area. Aside from traditional neighbourhoods such as Santa Cruz, Triana and others, those further away from the centre, such as Nervión, Sevilla Este, and El Porvenir have seen recent economic growth. Until the economic crisis of 2007, this urban area saw significant population growth and the development of new industrial and commercial parks.

During this period, availability of infrastructure in the city contributed to the growth of an economy dominated by the service sector, but in which industry still holds a considerable place.

Infrastructure

The 1990s saw massive growth in investment in infrastructure in Seville, largely due to its hosting of the Universal Exposition of Seville in 1992. This economic development of the city and its urban area is supported by good transportation links to other Spanish cities, including a high-speed AVE railway connection to Madrid, and a new international airport.

This harbour complex offers access to the Atlantic and the Mediterranean and allows trade in goods between the south of Spain (Andalusia, Extremadura) and Europe, the Middle East and North Africa. The port has undergone reorganisation. Annual tonnage rose to 5.3 million tonnes of goods in 2006.

Cartuja 93 is a research and development park, employing 15,000 persons. The Parque Tecnológico y Aeronáutico Aerópolis (Technological and Aeronautical Park) is focused on the aircraft industry. Outside of Seville are nine PS20 solar power towers which use the city's sunny weather to provide most of it with clean and renewable energy.

The Sevilla Tower skyscraper was started in March 2008 and was completed in 2015.

Seville has conference facilities, including the Conference and Convention Centre.

Research and development
The Consejo Superior de Investigaciones Científicas en Sevilla (CSIC) is based in the former Pavilion of Peru in the Maria Luisa Park. In April 2008 the city council of Seville provided a grant to renovate the building to create the Casa de la Ciencia (Science Centre) to encourage popular interest in science.
The internationally recognised company Neocodex has its headquarters in Seville; it maintains the first and largest DNA bank in Spain and has made significant contributions to scientific research in genetics. Seville is also considered an important technological and research centre for renewable energy and the aeronautics industry.

The output of the research centres in Sevillan universities working in tandem with city government, and the numerous local technology companies, have made Seville a leader among Spanish cities in technological research and development. The Parque Científico Tecnológico Cartuja 93 is a nexus of private and public investment in various fields of research.

Principal fields of innovation and research are telecommunications, new technologies, biotechnology (with applications in local agricultural practices), environment and renewable energy.

Transport

Bus
Seville is served by the TUSSAM (Transportes Urbanos de Sevilla) bus network which runs buses throughout the city. The Consorcio de Transportes de Sevilla communicates by bus with all the satellite towns of Seville.

Two bus stations serve transportation between surrounding areas and other cities: Plaza de Armas Station, with destinations north and west, and Prado de San Sebastián Station, covering routes to the south and east. Plaza de Armas station has direct bus lines to many Spanish cities as well as Lisbon, Portugal.

Metro
The Seville metro ("Metro de Sevilla" in Spanish) is a light metro network serving the city of Seville and its metropolitan area. The system is totally independent of any other rail or street traffic. All stations were built with platform screen doors.

It was the sixth Metro system to be built in Spain, after those in Madrid, Barcelona, Valencia, Bilbao and Palma de Mallorca. Currently, it is the fifth-biggest Metro company in Spain by the number of passengers carried (more than 12,000,000 in 2009).

The metro of Sevilla has 1 line with 22 stations and is currently expanding, with 3 more different lines projected.

Tram

MetroCentro is a surface tramway serving the centre of the city. It began operating in October 2007.

The service has just five stops: Plaza Nueva, Archivo de Indias, Puerta de Jerez, Prado de San Sebastián and San Bernardo, all as part of Phase I of the project. It is expected to be extended to Santa Justa AVE station, including four new stops: San Francisco Javier, Eduardo Dato, Luis de Morales, and Santa Justa. This extension was postponed although the City Council had made expanding the metro lines a priority.

Train
The Seville-Santa Justa railway station is served by the AVE high-speed rail system, operated by the Spanish state-owned rail company Renfe. A five-line commuter rail service (Cercanías) joins the city with the Metropolitan area. Seville is on the Red Ciudades AVE, a net created with Seville connected to 17 major cities of Spain with high-speed rail.

Although Seville is close to the Portuguese city of Faro, it is not possible to cross the border by train.

Bicycle

The Sevici community bicycle program has integrated bicycles into the public transport network. Bicycles are available for hire around the city at low cost, and green curb-raised bicycle lanes can be seen on most major streets. The number of people using bicycles as a means of transport in Seville has increased substantially in recent years, multiplying tenfold from 2006 to 2011. , an estimated 9 percent of all mechanized trips in the city (and 5.6 percent of all trips including those on foot) are made by bicycle.

The city council signed a contract with the multinational corporation JCDecaux, an outdoor advertising company. The public bicycle rental system is financed by a local advertising operator in return for the city signing over a 10-year licence to exploit citywide billboards. The overall scheme is called Cyclocity by JCDecaux, but each city's system is branded under an individual name.

As of 2022, some companies in the e-bike community bicycle program industry such as Lime (transportation company) and Ridemovi started working in the city, thanks to the new parking spots made by the City Council of Seville

Airport

The San Pablo Airport is the main airport for Seville and is Andalusia's second busiest airport, after Málaga's, and first in cargo. The airport handled 7,544,357 passengers and just under 9,891 tonnes of cargo in 2019. It has one terminal and one runway.

It is one of many bases for the Spanish low-cost carrier Vueling, and from November 2010 Ryanair based aircraft at the airport. In addition, Ryanair opened its first aircraft maintenance facility in Spain at Seville Airport in 2019.

This enabled low-cost direct flights to several Spanish cities, as well as to the neighbor country of Portugal with weekly flights to Porto and to other European cities.

Port

Seville is the only commercial river port in Spain and the only inland city in the country where cruise ships can arrive in the historical centre. On 21 August 2012, the Muelle de las Delicias, controlled by the Port Authority of Seville, hosted the cruise ship Azamara Journey for two days, the largest ship ever to visit the town. This vessel belongs to the shipping company Royal Caribbean and can accommodate up to 700 passengers.

Roads
Seville has one ring road, the SE-30, which connects with the dual carriageway of the south, the A-4, that directly communicates the city with Cádiz, Cordoba and Madrid. Also there is another dual carriageway, the A-92, linking the city with Osuna, Antequera, Granada, Guadix and Almeria. The A-49 links Seville with Huelva and the Algarve in the south of Portugal.

Public transportation statistics
The average amount of time people spend commuting with public transit in Sevilla, for example to and from work, on a weekday is 34 min. 7% of public transit riders, ride for more than two hours every day. The average amount of time people wait at a stop or station for public transit is eight minutes, while 15% of riders wait for over 20 minutes on average every day.

Education

Seville is home to three public universities. The University of Seville (US), founded in 1505; as of 2019, it had 72,000 students. The Pablo de Olavide University (UPO), founded in 1997, with 9,152 students in 2019; and the International University of Andalusia (UNIA), founded in 1994.

The US and the UPO are important centres of learning in Western Andalusia as they offer a wide range of academic courses; consequently, the city has a large number of students from Huelva and Cádiz.

Additionally, there is the School of Hispanic American Studies, founded in 1942, the Menéndez Pelayo International University, based in Santander, which operates branch campuses in Seville, and Loyola University Andalusia.

International primary and secondary schools
 Lycée Français de Séville (French school)
 Deutsche Schule Sevilla (German school)
 St. George's British School
Seville is also home to many international schools and colleges that cater to American students who come to study abroad.

Sport

Seville is the hometown of two rival association football teams: Real Betis Balompié and Sevilla Fútbol Club; both teams play in La Liga. Both teams have only won the league once each: Betis in 1935 and Sevilla in 1946. Only Sevilla has won European competitions, winning consecutive UEFA Cup finals in 2006 and 2007 and the UEFA Europa League in 2014, 2015, 2016 and 2020. The Ramón Sánchez Pizjuán and Benito Villamarín, stadiums of Sevilla and Betis respectively, were a venue during the 1982 FIFA World Cup. Also Sevilla's stadium hosted the 1986 European Cup Final and the multi-purpose stadium built in 1999 La Cartuja, was the venue for the 2003 UEFA Cup Final. Seville has an ACB League basketball club, the Real Betis Baloncesto.

Seville has hosted both indoor (1991) and outdoor (1999) World Championships in athletics, while housed the tennis Davis Cup final in 2004 and 2011. The city unsuccessfully bid for the 2004 and 2008 Summer Olympics, for which the 60,000-seat Estadio de La Cartuja was designed to stage. Seville's River Guadalquivir is one of only three FISA approved international training centres for rowing and the only one in Spain; the 2002 World Rowing Championships and the 2013 European Rowing Championships were held there.

In fiction
 The picaresque novel Rinconete y Cortadillo by Miguel de Cervantes takes place in the city of Seville.
 The novel La Femme et le pantin (The Woman and the Puppet) (1898) by Pierre Louÿs, adapted for film several times, is set mainly in Seville.
 Seville is the setting for the legend of Don Juan (inspired by the real aristocrat Don Miguel de Mañara) on the Paseo Alcalde Marqués de Contadero.
 Seville is the primary setting of many operas, the best known of which are Bizet's Carmen (based on Mérimée's novella), Rossini's The Barber of Seville, Verdi's La forza del destino, Beethoven's Fidelio, Mozart's Don Giovanni and The Marriage of Figaro, and Prokofiev's Betrothal in a Monastery.
 Seville is the setting of the novel The Seville Communion by Arturo Pérez-Reverte.
 Seville is both the location and setting for much of the 1985 Doctor Who television serial "The Two Doctors".
 Seville is also used as one of the locations in Dan Brown's Digital Fortress.
 Seville is one of the settings in Jostein Gaarder's book The Orange Girl (Appelsinpiken).
 Seville is the hometown of the two main characters in the 2000 film The Road to El Dorado by DreamWorks. Miguel and Tulio are con artists that stow away on a ship bound for the New World and win a map for the fabled lost city of gold, El Dorado, and are invariably seen as gods by the locals.
 Arthur Koestler's book Spanish Testament is based on the writer's experiences while held in the Seville prison, under a sentence of death, during the Spanish Civil War.
 Robert Wilson's police novel The Hidden Assassins (2006) concerns a terrorist incident in Seville and the political context thereof, with much local colour.
 The Plaza de España in the Parque de María Luisa appears in George Lucas' Star Wars: Episode II – Attack of the Clones, in The Dictator, starring Sacha Baron Cohen, as the palace of the dictator Aladeen, and in Lawrence of Arabia as the British Army headquarters in Cairo, while the courtyard was the King Alfonso XIII Hotel.
 The Plaza of the Americas also appeared in Lawrence, substituting for Jerusalem, and in Anthony Mann's El Cid. It also appears as the Palace of Vladek Sheybal's Bashaw in The Wind and the Lion (1975).
 The Alcázar and other sites appear in the television series Game of Thrones, in the cities of Dorne.
 In the 2016 film Assassin's Creed, Master Assassins Aguilar de Nerha and Maria escape execution and are pursued by Templars through the city, eventually performing Leaps of Faith off of an unfinished Seville Cathedral to escape.
 In Mission: Impossible 2, Ethan Hunt is sent to Seville to recruit Nyah Nordoff-Hall.

In travel writing
 The Tomb in Seville by Norman Lewis.

Twin towns – sister cities

Seville is twinned with the following cities:

  Angers (France), 1989.
  Barcelona (Spain), 1987.
  Buenos Aires (Argentina), 1976.
  Columbus, Ohio (United States), 1988.
  Córdoba (Spain), 1908.
  Guadalajara (Mexico), 1984.
  Havana (Cuba), 2007.
  Kansas City, Missouri (United States), 1969. The relationship between Seville and Kansas City is due to a small replica of the Giralda tower, Sevilla's cathedral belltower, that exists in Kansas City.
  Laredo (Spain), 2017.
  Marrakech (Morocco), 2017.
  Medina de Rioseco (Spain), 2016.
  San Salvador (El Salvador), 2018.
  Sevilla la Nueva (Spain).

Partnerships
  Kraków (Poland), 2002.

Titles
Seville has been given titles by Spanish monarchs and heads of state throughout its history.
 Very Noble, by King Ferdinand III of Castile after his reconquest of the city.
 Very Loyal, by King Alfonso X of Castile for supporting him against a rebellion. See also the Motto "NO8DO".
 Very Heroic, by King Ferdinand VII of Spain by Royal Document on 13 October 1817 for support against the French invasion.
 Invictus (Invincible in Latin), by Queen Isabella II of Spain for the city's resistance against General Van Halen's asedium and bombing in 1843.
 Mariana, by General Francisco Franco in 1946 for the city's devotion to the Virgin Mary.

Notable people
 Maria Antonietta of Spain, Queen consort of Sardinia (1729–1785)
 Al-Mu'tamid ibn Abbad, poet and Arabic king of Sevilla 1040–1095
 Physician Avenzoar
 The family of the Arabic historian and sociologist Ibn Khaldun
 13th-century poet Ibn Sahl of Seville
 Renaissance composers Cristóbal de Morales, Francisco Guerrero
 16th-century novelist Mateo Alemán
 Playwrights Lope de Rueda and Hermanos Alvarez Quintero
 Historian of New Spain Bartolomé de Las Casas
 Colonial governor of La Florida and Cuba: Laureano de Torres y Ayala
 Colonial governor of La Florida: Pablo de Hita y Salazar
 Baroque painters Diego Velázquez, Valdés Leal and Bartolomé Esteban Murillo
 Explorer and astronomer Antonio de Ulloa
 Renaissance poets Fernando de Herrera and Gutierre de Cetina
 Notable Costumbrista painter who liked to depict the 19th century society of Seville and its buildings José Jiménez Aranda
 Romantic poet Gustavo Adolfo Bécquer
 Bullfighters Juan Belmonte, Curro Romero, Ignacio Sánchez Mejías, Emilio Muñoz and José Gómez Ortega
 Second Spanish Republic Prime Minister Diego Martinez, communist politician José Díaz and Carlist politician Manuel Fal.
 20th-century poets:
 Vicente Aleixandre (Nobel Laureate)
 Antonio and Manuel Machado
 Luis Cernuda
 Jose Julio Cabanillas Serrano continuing in the 21st–century
 Composer Joaquín Turina
 Cartoonist William Haselden
 Actors Juan Diego, Paco León
 Actresses Soledad Miranda, Verónica Sánchez, Carmen Sevilla, Paz Vega, Azucena Hernández
 Models
 Teresa Sánchez López who won the title of Miss National in the Miss Spain contest 1984 and, representing Spain, was close to the crown of Miss Universe in 1985 (1st runner up).
 Eva Maria González beauty queen and model who was Miss España 2003 (representing Andalusia)
 Singers Isabel Pantoja, Juanita Reina, Lole y Manuel, Paquita Rico, El Caracol, Falete, Pastora Soler, and Mala Rodríguez
 Comedian Manuel Summers
 Navy officer Miguel Buiza Fernández-Palacios who became Captain General of the Spanish Republican Navy
 Association footballers José Antonio Reyes, Fernando "Nando" Muñoz, Ricardo Serna, Sergio Ramos, Jesús Navas, Antonio Puerta, Carlos Marchena, Jesús Capitán "Capi", Adrián
 Olympic swimmer Fátima Madrid
 Politicians Felipe González, President of the Government of Spain from 1982 to 1996, and Alfonso Guerra, vice-president from 1982 to 1991
 Maria Pages, dancer
 Jairo Barrull Fernández, Spanish Gypsy flamenco dancer
 El Risitas, humorist
 Criminal Manuel Delgado Villegas, serial killer
 Drag queen Carmen Farala, winner of the first season of Drag Race España
 Embroiderer Esperanza Elena Caro

See also

 Cadillac Seville, a car that was named after the city
 Azulejo
 Isla Mágica
 Seville Public Library
 Seville Statement on Violence

References

External links

 Seville in the official website of Tourism in Spain
 Official website of the city council. 
 Postal Codes in Seville 

 
Archaeological sites in Spain
Phoenician colonies in Spain
Roman sites in Spain
Municipalities of the Province of Seville
Port cities and towns on the Spanish Atlantic coast
Province of Seville